Kent is an unincorporated community in Stephenson County, Illinois. Kent is home to Forreston State Bank, Kent Feed Mill, St. Paul's Lutheran Church (ELCA), Kent United Methodist Church, Kent Fire Department and the Kent U.S. Post Office.

History
Kent was surveyed and platted in 1887 at the same time the Chicago Great Western Railroad laid its tracks through Stephenson County. When the village was founded it was the only village within its township and it was thought that the area had great potential for growth. Kent is probably named for the Reverend Aratus Kent, a traveling evangelist from Galena, Illinois. The post office in present-day Kent was established on July 29, 1850.

Geography
Kent is located in Stephenson County, Illinois about 12 miles west of Freeport. Kent is located in the southwestern part of its township, near the Stephenson-Jo Daviess County line. It is also in proximity to Pearl City.

Demographics
According to the 2000 Census, statistics which included the village of Kent and its surrounding zip code area, 274 people reside within the zip code 61044.

See also
Battle of Kellogg's Grove
Black Hawk War
Kellogg's Grove

References

Further reading

Keister, Philip Lincoln. Kent: For a Century and a Quarter, 1827-1952, Windmill Publications, 2000 (reprint of 1952 sesquicentennial book),.
Knowlton, D.A. "Presbyterianism in Stephenson County, Illinois", pp. 193–96, Illinois State Historical Society, Journal of the Illinois State Historical Society, vol. 11, 1918.

External links
NACo

Unincorporated communities in Stephenson County, Illinois
Unincorporated communities in Illinois
Populated places established in 1887